is an Australian contemporary fashion designer.

Early life
Born in Kyoto, Japan in 1964, he emigrated to Australia in 1986 at the age of 21. In his early 20s, Isogawa worked in Japanese restaurants and as a tour guide. He studied fashion at the East Sydney Technical College, drawing inspiration from contemporary Japanese design.

Career

Isogawa opened a store in Woollahra, Sydney, in 1993.

By the late 1990s, he was known internationally. His clothes appear under his own label and are sold in Australia and New Zealand, and 10 other countries. He is one of the few Australian designers to exhibit and sell his clothing in Paris, His commercial fashion label, Akira, concentrates on women's fashion.

Other
Isogawa's designs have been exhibited in a number of major Australian galleries.  A number of his lavish costume creations while a student survive in a catalogued retrospective of the RAT Party era kept at Sydney's Powerhouse Museum. He has also worked as a costume designer for the Sydney Dance Company.

In 1999, Australian Fashion Industry Awards named Isogawa as a Designer of the Year and Womenswear Designer of the Year.

Isogawa has also designed three rug collections with Designer Rugs, using prints from his fashion designs. The first collection launched in 2005, followed by 'Kisetsu' in 2007, and "Hirameki' in 2012.

Isogawa has a passion for animals and incorporates his beliefs into his design philosophy.  "I consider myself a compassionate member of society. I understand that our actions impact on all living beings and wonder why we resort to such cruelty when there are so many man-made materials that we can use." In 2011, he joined the council of Voiceless, the animal protection institute.

Sydney's Museum of Applied Arts and Sciences showed the retrospective Akira Isogawa in 2018–2019, and his work was included in the Victoria and Albert Museum's 2020 exhibition Kimono: Kyoto to Catwalk in London.

Honours 
In 2005, he was honoured on a commemorative Australian postage stamp,  along with other Australian fashion designers, Collette Dinnigan, Carla Zampatti, Joe Saba, Jenny Bannister and Prue Acton.

In 2005, Isogawa was depicted on the 'Australian Legends' series of stamps issued by Australia Post and in 2007 he was named the country's first Fashion Laureate.

Footnotes

External links

 Akira label website
 Akira Isogawa exhibition at the National Gallery of Victoria.

 Akira SS 08/09 collection gallery - Harper's BAZAAR
 Lucire magazine interview with Isogawa
 Three Layer Cake interview with Akira
 Interview with Akira Isogawa on Australian Edge
 Profile on Akira Isogawa
 Akira Isogawa Rugs

1964 births
Living people
People from Kyoto
Japanese emigrants to Australia
Australian fashion designers
People from Sydney
Bukkyo University alumni